Archips nigriplaganus is a species of moth of the family Tortricidae. It is found in North America, where it has been recorded from Kentucky, North Carolina, Quebec, Tennessee, Vermont and West Virginia.

The wingspan is about 19 mm. The ground colour of the forewings is yellow tawny with darker transverse bands and two small dark spots in the basal area. The hindwings are light grey on the base and disc. The upper half of the outer margin and the apical margin are light straw. Adults have been recorded on wing from May to July.

References

Moths described in 1986
Archips
Moths of North America